The 2000 German Grand Prix (formally the Grosser Mobil 1 Preis von Deutschland 2000) was a Formula One motor race held on 30 July 2000, at the Hockenheimring near Hockenheim in Baden-Württemberg, Germany before a crowd of 102,000 spectators. It was the eleventh round of the 2000 Formula One World Championship and the 62nd German Grand Prix. Ferrari driver Rubens Barrichello won the 45-lap race starting from 18th position. Mika Häkkinen finished second for the McLaren team with teammate David Coulthard third.

Before the event, Michael Schumacher led the World Drivers' Championship and his team Ferrari led the World Constructors' Championship. Coulthard started from pole position alongside Michael Schumacher after lapping fastest in qualifying. Coulthard's teammate Häkkinen began from third. At the first corner Michael Schumacher moved to the left and Giancarlo Fisichella collided with him and both drivers retired. Häkkinen took the lead of the race which he held until an intruder penetrated circuit limits on lap 25 causing drivers to make pit stops under safety car conditions. Barrichello, meanwhile, had gained thirteen positions to run fifth until the first safety car period. Häkkinen retook the lead after Coulthard pitted on lap 27. Barrichello stayed out on dry slick tyres, taking the lead which he held to achieve the first victory of his Formula One career. It was also the first  Formula One victory for a Brazilian driver since Ayrton Senna won the 1993 Australian Grand Prix.

Barrichello's victory was considered popular amongst the Formula One paddock as it came after a setback during his career. The race result meant Häkkinen and Coulthard were tied for second but the points lead of Schumacher in the World Drivers' Championship was reduced to two points. Barrichello remained a further eight points behind the McLaren drivers. In the World Constructors' Championship, McLaren remained four points behind Ferrari, who were 80 points ahead of Williams with six races of the season remaining. The track intruder, named as 47-year-old Frenchman Robert Sehli, later apologised for his actions and was fined by the track's management.

Background
The 2000 German Grand Prix was the eleventh of the seventeen rounds in the 2000 Formula One World Championship and took place at the  clockwise Hockenheimring near the town of Hockenheim in Baden-Württemberg, Germany on 30 July 2000. There were eleven teams (each representing a different constructor) each fielding two drivers. The drivers and teams were the same as those on the season entry list. Sole tyre supplier Bridgestone brought the soft and medium dry tyre compounds, as well as the intermediate and full wet-weather compounds to the race.

Before the race, Ferrari driver Michael Schumacher led the World Drivers' Championship with 56 points, ahead of David Coulthard of McLaren with 50 points and his teammate Mika Häkkinen with 48 points. Ferrari's Rubens Barrichello was fourth with 36 points and Benetton driver Giancarlo Fisichella was fifth with 18 points. In the World Constructors' Championship Ferrari led with 92 points, McLaren and Williams with 88 points and 19 points were second and third respectively, whilst Benetton with 18 points stood in fourth position and BAR were in fifth place with 12 points.

McLaren, Benetton, Jordan, Jaguar, Sauber and BAR went to Silverstone over three days. Olivier Panis, McLaren's test driver, set the fastest time on the first day of testing. Jaguar test driver Luciano Burti damaged his  car's suspension, front and rear wings, and sidepod in an accident at Stowe corner. Testing was briefly stopped and Jaguar shipped a spare car for the next day's testing. Panis remained fastest on the second day. Jarno Trulli damaged his suspension and rear wing, resulting in repairs which limited his team's testing time. Burti's right rear wheel detached. Fisichella led the third and final day's running. Ferrari test driver Luca Badoer spent four days concentrating on testing engine and aerodynamic development at the Fiorano Circuit whilst Michael Schumacher did practice starts and component testing on the fourth day.

Jaguar's Eddie Irvine was passed fit in the days leading up to the race. He arrived at the previous race ill with a suspected bout of appendicitis and withdrew at the end of the Friday practice sessions. He was replaced by Burti. Irvine later travelled to a hospital in London where he was diagnosed with a swollen intestine. Irvine said he felt ready to race again: "I'm looking forward to Hockenheim. I have been keeping tabs on the team's Silverstone test this week and we're all encouraged by what has been achieved."

Teams setup their cars for the long straights of the Hockenheimring circuit, requiring them to reduce aerodynamic downforce and increase aerodynamic efficiency. The Jaguar team introduced multiple features to its cars. It replaced the large screens fitted behind the front wheels with smaller screens placed between the suspension. Jordan's new car, the EJ10B, was also introduced that weekend; the team had used their primary 2000 car, the EJ10, for the previous ten races. Originally due to be introduced at the previous race in Austria, the car was required to undergo Fédération Internationale de l'Automobile (FIA) safety tests on its bodywork and Jordan wanted to develop more spare parts for the EJ10B, delaying the car's race début.

Practice
There were four practice sessions preceding Sunday's race—two one-hour sessions on Friday, and two 45-minute sessions on Saturday. The Friday sessions were held in dry and cloudy conditions, becoming damp during the day, making the track slippery. Michael Schumacher set the first session's fastest time at 1 minute and 43.532 seconds, almost six-tenths of a second faster than Häkkinen. Barrichello, third, was just off Häkkinen's pace with Coulthard setting the fourth fastest time; both Barrichello and Coulthard led during the session. Jordan's Heinz-Harald Frentzen, BAR driver Ricardo Zonta, Fisichella, Sauber's Mika Salo, Williams's Ralf Schumacher and Herbert made up positions five through ten. Few incidents occurred during the session as some drivers went off the circuit. Trulli's engine failed after 20 minutes at the Ostkurve turn and yellow flags were waved as marshals moved his car. After the session concluded and rain arrived at the track, Jenson Button spun and crashed against the inside barriers at the pit lane entry, removing his car's front wing.

Heavy rain making the track wet and more dirty affected the second practice session, slowing lap times. Drivers became acquainted with the damp surface and wet-weather tyres. Competitive lap times began to be set when the circuit became dry enough after almost three-quarters of the session had passed. Michael Schumacher did not manage to better his lap but remained quickest. Frentzen was running quicker and was second fastest. The two McLaren drivers were slower—Häkkinen in third and Coulthard fifth–although both drivers were testing race set-up and brake performance. They were separated by Barrichello. Trulli, Zonta, Villeneuve, Fisichella and Salo followed in the top ten. Multiple drivers entered the gravel traps during the session. The two Minardi drivers crashed during the session. Gastón Mazzacane hit the barrier in the stadium section and Marc Gené beached his car in the last turn's gravel trap. Ralf Schumacher missed half of the session as his team switched the engine in his car.

The Saturday morning sessions were held in damp weather conditions and intermittent rain. Throughout most of the session, the circuit dried with sunlight appearing through the clouds. Häkkinen set the third session's fastest lap, a 1:44.144, one-tenth of a second quicker than Arrows driver Pedro de la Rosa. Coulthard was third fastest, ahead of Frentzen, Salo. Trulli, Barrichello, Michael Schumacher, Villeneuve and Fisichella in positions four through ten. As the racing line began to dry, Ralf Schumacher, who recorded just a single lap in the second half of the session, lost control of the rear of his car on a damp patch after crossing the start/finish line and struck the turn one tyre barrier. Jean Alesi simultaneously beached his Prost car in the gravel due to a rear suspension failure on the damp circuit.

In the final practice session, the circuit had become completely dry and lap times lowered when drivers located more grip on it. Nearly every driver exited the pit lane in the first minutes, giving teams a final chance to significantly adjust their cars before qualifying. Häkkinen set the day's fastest time, a 1:41.658, that he recorded with 15 minutes remaining in practice; his teammate Coulthard finished in third place. The Ferrari pair Michael Schumacher and Barrichello were second and fourth respectively in. Frentzen fell to fifth, with Fisichella sixth fastest and was happy with his car's feel. Button, Salo, Villeneuve and Trulli were in positions seventh to tenth. Fisichella's car suffered an engine failure in the session's closing seconds at the North Kurve turn with smoke billowing from his car. Michael Schumacher went  backwards into the wall at the Opel Kurve corner in the stadium section after the session concluded  Schumacher thus drove the spare Ferrari in qualifying.

Qualifying
Saturday's afternoon one hour qualifying session saw each driver limited to twelve laps, with the starting order decided by their fastest laps. During this session, the 107% rule was in effect, necessitating each driver to set a time within 107 per cent of the quickest lap to qualify for the race. The session was held in damp weather with intermittent rain; drivers variously used grooved and wet-weather compound tyres. He was joined on the grid's front row by Michael Schumacher who was 1.3 seconds slower than Coulthard, going three-tenths of a second faster than his previous best lap to move from fourth to second. Fisichella qualified third in the spare Benetton car that had incorrect gear ratios. He spun on his first run and held second until Michael Schumacher's lap as the rain tapered off. Fisichella was fined $5,000 for not placing his car at the pit-lane weighbridge to allow the FIA to check if his vehicle was within the legal minimum weight limit. Häkkinen, who qualified fourth, three hundredths of a second slower than Fisichella, admitted to being cautious about going off the track due to the weather. De La Rosa in his then career-best qualifying performance qualified fifth in the spare Arrows car while his race vehicle was being prepared. Trulli and Wurz were both satisfied qualifying in sixth and seventh. Herbert was the quicker of the two Jaguars in eighth. Villeneuve secured ninth in his team's spare car after losing control of his car and stalling at the Jim Clark chicane, disrupting Frentzen's running. Irvine, tenth, was slowed by Gené midway in him trying to lap faster.

Jos Verstappen had problems starting his engine, resulting in Arrows removing the car's floor to install a starter. A lack of qualifying laps for Verstappen left him 11th. Zonta, 12th, used a new engine and could not set a faster lap after catching by Alesi at the final chicane and being slowed by him into the stadium area. He was ahead of Alesi's teammate Nick Heidfeld in 13th whose lap was set simultaneously as Fisichella. Ralf Schumacher, 14th, was quicker than teammate Button in 16th; Williams were caught out by the change in conditions. They were separated by Salo in 15th who encountered two cars on his first fast lap and the weather prevented him from going faster. Frentzen, 17th, spent the majority of qualifying 107 per cent outside of the fastest lap; the stewards disallowed his first quick lap after he cut the first chicane in his attempt to find space and pass two slower vehicles to lap quicker and to avoid being hindered by aerodynamic turbulence. Barrichello, 18th, used his teammate's repaired race car after his vehicle developed oil-leak issues; his mechanics adjusted the settings of his pedals to suit Barrichello's right-footed braking style before he could drive. Barrichello was also requested to park at the weighbridge for car weight checks. Sauber's Pedro Diniz, 19th, lost time amongst slower cars, with Alesi 20th and Mazzacane 21st. Mazzacane's teammate Gené in 22nd incorrectly used wet-weather tyres and abandoned his car on the track with a gearbox fault; he drove the spare Minardi car.

Qualifying classification

Warm-up

The drivers took to the track at 09:30 Central European Summer Time (GMT+2) for a 30-minute warm-up session. Ten minutes in, Coulthard went fastest in warm-up with a lap of 1:44.065; Häkkinen was second in the other McLaren car, with De La Rosa third and Michael Schumacher fourth. Villeneuve and Verstappen collided at the Jim Clark chicane during their installation lap just as warm-up started. Yellow flags were necessitated as both Villeneuve and Verstappen's cars were stationary and blocking much of the circuit. Verstappen sustained multiple arm abrasions. Coulthard spun backwards into the tyre wall at the final double right-hand corner in the stadium section after driving wide onto dust. He damaged his car's front wing, and returned to the pit lane to drive the spare McLaren. Waved yellow flags were again necessitated when the engine cover on Heidfeld's car detached into the Ostkurve corner, littering the circuit with carbon fibre debris. De La Rosa sustained a right-rear tyre puncture when he drove over some of the carbon fibre debris and stopped his car at the side of the track. De La Rosa was unhurt.

Race

The race started before 102,000 spectators at 14:00 local time. The conditions for the start of the race were dry, but became damp and wet as it progressed. Rain began falling in the stadium section eleven minutes before the parade lap but it stopped eight minutes later. Ferrari adjusted the angle of the front wing on Michael Schumacher's car. Several drivers made rear wing adjustments that slowed them slightly but improved their steering in tight corners. During the parade lap Button's engine was suddenly unable to start and he was required to start from the back of the grid. When the lights went out to begin the race, Coulthard and Michael Schumacher made slow starts. Coulthard went hard right to block Michael Schumacher's path, allowing his teammate Häkkinen to steer left and take the race lead. Noticing Häkkinen to the left of him, Michael Schumacher went across to the outside line and his left-rear wheel and Fisichella's front wing made contact. Both drivers went off the circuit, struck the tyre barrier at turn one and retired from the race. The safety car was not deployed since both cars were far off the track.

Barrichello moved from 18th to 10th place at the end of the first lap. At the completion of the first lap, Häkkinen led from Coulthard, Trulli, De La Rosa, Irvine, Herbert, and Verstappen. Häkkinen began to maintain his lead from teammate Coulthard. After Irvine fell to seventh place when Verstappen overtook him for sixth, Herbert moved into fifth position on lap two. Further down the field Barrichello continued to gain positions when he passed both BAR drivers for eighth. The McLaren drivers managed to maintain a gap to Trulli who set the race's fastest lap, 1:46.321. Irvine lost a further position to Barrichello on lap three following a short battle, as Frentzen claimed 14th from Diniz. On lap four, Frentzen passed Heidfeld for 13th. On the same lap Verstappen locked up his tyres to avoid a collision with Herbert. This allowed Barrichello to pass Verstappen for sixth into the Jim Clark chicane on lap five as the Arrows car struggled under braking into the chicanes. Herbert lost fifth position to Barrichello on lap six with Frentzen continuing to move up the field by passing Ralf Schumacher and Wurz for 11th.

Barrichello began setting consecutive fastest laps as he closed the gap to De La Rosa. Frentzen passed Zonta for tenth position on lap seven. On the following lap, half of Verstappen's engine cover was shed from its chassis. Frentzen managed to gain a further four positions in the next four laps. Further down, Ralf Schumacher overtook Zonta for 11th and Diniz passed teammate Salo for 14th. Barrichello caught De La Rosa by lap eleven and passed him for fourth a lap later. De La Rosa began to come under pressure from Frentzen. Herbert pulled over to the side of the track with clutch failure on lap 13. Barrichello passed Trulli for third under braking for the Jim Clark chicane two laps later. Barrichello became the first driver to make a pit stop by entering the pit lane for the first of two planned stops at the conclusion of lap 17 that took 7.2 seconds to finish. He rejoined the event in sixth position. Frentzen made his pit stop one lap later and re joined in sixth place, behind Barrichello. By lap 20, Häkkinen had a lead of 1.4 seconds over Coulthard, who in turn was almost 22 seconds ahead of Trulli. De La Rosa was a further 2.1 seconds behind Trulli, and was being caught by Barrichello in fifth who set a new fastest lap, a 1:44.300. Villeneuve overtook Irvine for eighth place on lap 22.
On lap 25, a man sporting a white raincoat with French writing critical of Mercedes-Benz emerged from beside the barriers and stepped onto the outside verge towards the Ostkurve. He ran in front of a group of cars approaching him at high speed to the inside of the circuit to avoid being caught by marshals. The incident prompted race officials to deploy the safety car and the closed field up. With the pit stop window coming up, teams immediately brought their drivers into the pit lane to take advantage of the scenario with Trulli and De La Rosa the first to make pit stops. Both Häkkinen and Coulthard had passed the pit lane following the safety car's deployment. McLaren called in Häkkinen to the pit lane at the end of lap 26. His teammate Coulthard remained out on worn tyres because of confusion over the radio whether he should have entered the pit lane. Coulthard would make a pit stop on the following lap and emerged in sixth place. On the same lap, the man was caught and escorted off the circuit. The safety car period was advantageous to drivers who had made a pit stop before it was deployed.

Racing resumed on lap 29 when the safety car entered the pit lane. Trulli immediately came under pressure from Barrichello and withstood the latter's attempts to pass him. Ralf Schumacher spun at the Jim Clark chicane on lap 30 and Verstappen was forced wide in avoidance. Later on Diniz attempted to pass Alesi on the approach to the Ayrton Senna chicane and went across the latter at high speed. Alesi crashed into the barrier at high speed, removing both his car's left-hand side wheels. Diniz's car was not damaged. Alesi suffered from abdominal pains, dizziness and vomiting. Officials again deployed the safety car as carbon fibre was scattered across the grass and needed removing by marshals. At the conclusion of the 31st lap, the safety car was withdrawn and the race resumed with Häkkinen leading.

Salo avoided making contact with the slow to react Wurz on the start/finish straight, sending Wurz spinning onto the grass. Although Wurz stopped at the side of the circuit with gearbox failure, his car was able to be moved away by marshals and racing continued without the need for a third safety car period due to the Hockenheimring's long length. Light rain began to fall in the stadium on lap 32 and on other parts of the circuit a lap later. Button was the first driver to make a pit stop on the following lap and his Williams pit crew changed his dry tyres to wets. On lap 34, Gené became the race's seventh retirement with a failed engine and laid oil on the circuit. The rain had intensified during the same lap and became a downpour in the stadium section on lap 35. Villeneuve spun after his teammate Zonta made minor contact with the rear of his car exiting the first corner on that lap but managed to continue.

All drivers, apart from Barrichello, Coulthard, Frentzen and Zonta, made pit stops for wet-weather tyres. After technical director Ross Brawn informed Barrichello of Häkkinen's final pit stop, Barrichello and Ferrari agreed he could remain on the circuit. They believed the rain had not reached the track's outer edge and that grooved tyres could still allow for fast laps. Information received by Brawn determined Barrichello could lap faster than wet-weather shod cars. Barrichello was circumspect through the wet stadium section, where Häkkinen lapped approximately three seconds quicker than him. Häkkinen lost most of the gained advantage through the dry chicanes and provided little grip to his wet-weather tyres. Trulli was imposed a ten-second stop-go penalty on lap 37 because marshals reported him for passing Barrichello who had just exited the pit lane after the first turn. He took the penalty immediately and fell to 11th. Zonta was also given a penalty but crashed into the tyre wall at the Sachs hairpin because he was distracted by a radio message informing him of the penalty. Frentzen pressured Coulthard who cut the Jim Clark chicane on lap 38. Coulthard became the final driver to make a pit stop on the same lap. He fell to fifth. Button then passed De La Rosa for sixth.

At the completion of lap 39, with the pit stops completed, the top six were Barrichello, Häkkinen, Frentzen, Salo, Coulthard, and Button. Frentzen retired with gearbox failure at the start/finish straight on lap 40 as Coulthard overtook Salo for third. Heidfeld became the race's final retirement as a result of alternator failure on lap 40. Rain returned two laps later. On lap 43 Button caught Salo and made an aggressive overtake on him for fourth position. Häkkinen finished second in his McLaren 7.4 seconds behind Barrichello, with teammate Coulthard third. Button achieved his best result of the 2000 season with fourth, ahead of Salo in fifth and De La Rosa the final points-scorer in sixth. Ralf Schumacher, Villeneuve, Trulli, Irvine and Mazzacane filled the next five positions, with Heidfeld the final classified driver despite his alternator failure. Of the other race retirement, Verstappen spun into the gravel trap in the stadium section and stalled after completing 39 laps.

Post-race
The top three drivers appeared on the podium to collect their trophies and in the subsequent press conference. Barrichello's maiden Formula One victory was very popular amongst spectators and team personnel, because it came after a setback earlier in his career, not least a serious accident during practice for the 1994 San Marino Grand Prix that left him unconscious. Barrichello dedicated his victory to Senna who had helped him during the early phase of his career. He also revealed that it was his decision to stay out on dry tyres as he believed he would have an advantage on the straights and the chicanes, although he flat-spotted a tyre in the closing stages of the Grand Prix which reduced his visibility. Häkkinen said that he felt "in control" during the first phase of the event, although he admitted that he was conservative on the wet tyres and could have secured the win on dry tyres. Coulthard revealed that he utilised tactics performed by Michael Schumacher at the start after he sought clarification on the rules regarding such manoeuvres. He additionally commented that he was unable to radio his team in the forest sections which caused him to stay out for an additional lap when Häkkinen made a pit stop.

Button was delighted with his then career best finish of fourth and praised his team for the timing to switch to wet-weather tyres. Salo described his race as "hard" because of him opting to have a high downforce set-up meaning he was slower than his rivals on the straights. Additionally he revealed that towards the end of the race, he did not have oil in his engine with temperatures continuously rising. He thought the Grand Prix was "strange" though he was happy with the effort of his team. Michael Schumacher, who retired on the first lap, after Fisichella collided with him, accused the latter of causing the incident. "I am out of the race not because of David (Coulthard) but because of Fisichella." he said. Fisichella however said that he was maintaining his racing line and believed that drivers should choose their preferred racing line before he described his Grand Prix as a "waste". Schumacher's manager Willi Weber rejected reports that the accident was part of a conspiracy.

The majority of media attention, however, was focussed on the intruder who penetrated the circuit's barriers on lap 25. He was revealed to be man named Robert Sehli, a 47-year-old father of three from France who worked at a Mercedes-Benz production factory in Le Mans for 22 years. The press disclosed that Sehli was protesting his being dismissed on health grounds. Additional information revealed that he planned to protest 15 seconds before the start of the formation lap but marshals stopped this by dragging him off the circuit. Sehli had attempted to organise something similar at the  before the FIA Photographers' Delegate stopped him in the pit lane ten laps before the race ended. He was released on a DM 2,000 ($945) bail the Monday after the German Grand Prix. Retired Formula One driver Hans-Joachim Stuck said that Sehli had "succeeded in avenging himself on Mercedes." Brawn said that Sehli's actions were "very, very dangerous" and that similar intrusions "should never be allowed to happen again." However the vice-president of Mercedes-Benz Motorsport Norbert Haug criticised the police's approach towards Sehli, calling it a "scandal". The Hockenheimring track owners Hockenheimring GmbH announced that it filed a trespassing charge against Sehli. He would be awarded compensation from Mercedes-Benz and apologised for the track invasion. On 16 December Sehli won a court case against Mercedes-Benz who were ordered to pay F91,000 for "dismissing him without any conclusive reasons". He was however fined £600 by Hockenheimring GmbH for breaching circuit limits. 

The race result meant that Michael Schumacher's lead in the World Drivers' Championship was reduced to two points. Häkkinen moved into joint second, level on points with team-mate Coulthard; both were eight points ahead of Barrichello, with Fisichella remaining a distant fifth with 18 points. In the World Constructors' Championship, McLaren reduced Ferrari's lead to four points. Williams, with 22 points, increased the gap to their rivals Benetton to four points, whilst BAR maintained fifth position on 12 points, with six races of the season remaining.

Race classification
Drivers who scored championship points are denoted in bold.

Championship standings after the race 

Drivers' Championship standings

Constructors' Championship standings

References

German Grand Prix
German Grand Prix
Grand Prix
July 2000 sports events in Europe